The Medieval history of Cyprus starts with the division of the Roman Empire into an Eastern and Western half.

Byzantine period
After the division of the Roman Empire into an eastern half and a western half, Cyprus came under the rule of Byzantium. The cities of Cyprus were destroyed by two successive earthquakes in 332 and 342 AD and this marked the end of an era and at the same time the beginning of a new one, very much connected with modern life in Cyprus. Most of the cities were not rebuilt, save Salamis which was rebuilt on a smaller scale and renamed Constantia after the Roman Emperor Constantius II, son of Constantine the Great, residing in Constantinople. The new city was now the capital of the island. It was mainly Christian and due to this some alterations were made during the rebuilding. The palaestra was turned into a meeting place and many architectural elements were used to erect spacious churches decorated with murals, mosaics and coloured marbles.

The main event in Cyprus in this period was the spreading of the Christian faith. At that time, its bishop, while still subject to the Church, was made autocephalous by the First Council of Ephesus. People were engaged very much in matters of faith, especially fighting the effort of the Eastern Orthodox Patriarch of Antioch to put the Church of Cyprus under his control. They were finally successful in 488, when Archbishop Anthemius guided by a dream discovered the tomb of Barnabas with the saint's body lying in a coffin and on his chest a copy of the Gospel of Matthew in Barnabas' own writing. Having the relics with him, Anthemius dashed to Constantinople and presented them to Emperor Zeno. The latter was very much impressed and he not only confirmed the independence of the Church of Cyprus but he also gave to the Archbishop in perpetuity three privileges that are as much alive today as they were then, namely to carry a sceptre instead of a pastoral staff, to sign with red ink and to wear a purple cloak during services. By the beginning of the 7th century, the patriarch of Alexandria was John the Merciful from Amathus. Another important Cypriot of the time is the church writer Leontios of Neapolis.

Arab conquest and Arab–Byzantine condominium
In 649 AD the Arabs made the first attack on the island under the leadership of Muawiyah I. They conquered the capital Salamis - Constantia after a brief siege, but drafted a treaty with the local rulers. In the course of this expedition a relative of Muhammad, Umm-Haram, fell from her mule near the Salt Lake at Larnaca and was killed. She was buried at that spot and the Hala Sultan Tekke was built there in Ottoman times. Under Abu'l-Awar, the Arabs returned in 650 and installed a garrison of 12,000 on part of the island, where they remained until 680.

In 688, the emperor Justinian II and the caliph Abd al-Malik reached an unprecedented agreement. The Arabs evacuated the island, and for the next 300 years, Cyprus was ruled jointly by both the Caliphate and the Byzantines as a condominium, despite the nearly constant warfare between the two parties on the mainland. The collected taxes were divided among the Arabs and the emperor.

Under Basil I the Macedonian (r. 867–886) Byzantine troops recaptured Cyprus, which was established as a theme, but after seven years the island reverted to the previous status quo. Once again, in 911, the Cypriots helped a Byzantine fleet under admiral Himerios, and in retaliation the Arabs under Damian of Tarsus ravaged the island for four months and carried off many captives. The isolation of Cyprus from the rest of the Greek-speaking world assisted the formation of a separate Cypriot dialect. This period of Arab influence lasted until the 10th century.

Byzantine reconquest
In the year 965 or slightly earlier, the Byzantines reconquered the island and installed theme. The general Niketas Chalkoutzes led the reconquest, of which no details are known, and was probably the first governor of Cyprus after that.

A rebellion by governor Theophilos Erotikos in 1042, and another in 1092 by Rhapsomates, failed as they were quickly subdued by imperial forces.

In 1185, the last Byzantine governor of Cyprus, Isaac Komnenos, from a minor line of the Komnenos imperial house, rose in rebellion and attempted to seize the throne. His attempted coup was unsuccessful, but Komnenos was able to retain control of the island. Byzantine actions against Komnenos failed because he enjoyed the support of William II of Sicily. The emperor had agreed with the sultan of Egypt to close Cypriot harbours to the Crusaders.

Crusades–Lusignan period 1095–1489
During the Siege of Antioch, a battle of the First Crusade, the Crusader army received supplies from Byzantine-controlled Cyprus.

In the 12th century A.D. the island became a target of the crusaders. Richard the Lionheart landed in Limassol on 1 June 1191 in search of his sister and his bride Berengaria, whose ship had become separated from the fleet in a storm. Upon her arrival, the ruler Isaac Comnenus of Cyprus requested that Berengaria deboard, which she refused, and upon her own refusal was denied supplies from Comnenus. Richard took this as an insult and attacked the island which was easily subdued. Comnenus was bound to lend aid to Richard in his crusade against Saladin, an oath which he later broke, and Richard had him bound in silver chains (as he swore not to bind Comnenus in iron) and kept prisoner till his death in 1194 or 1195. The Cypriot chronicler Neophytus gave Richard the epithet of "the wretch". Richard married Berengaria in Limassol on 12 May 1192. She was crowned as Queen of England by John Fitzluke, Bishop of Évreux. The crusader fleet continued to St. Jean d'Acre on 5 June.

The army of Richard the Lionheart continued to occupy Cyprus and raised taxes. After local revolts he decided to sell the island to the Knights Templar, who were unable to hold the island because of further hostility among the local population due to tax raising. A rebellion which took place on April 6, 1192 made the Templars sell the island to Guy de Lusignan (1192–1194) who established himself in May 1192.

Guy de Lusignan
Richard saw this sale as advantageous to himself, as the island wasn't worth the trouble to him, as Guy had been captured by Saladin at Jerusalem. Though released later, in 1192 he was ousted in favor of Henry II of Champagne as a result, and was willing to buy Cyprus. The crusaders described him as "simplex et minus astutus", though he did set the foundation of Cypriot society in the Lusignan period. He invited Palestinian barons, disenfranchised by Saladin to move on the island, granting them feudal rights over huge estates, using the Cypriots as serfs.

Aimery
Geoffrey of Lusignan passed up the position of ruler, so Guy was succeeded by his older brother Aimery (1194–1205). During his reign, the Latin church took over the dioceses of the Orthodox, creating a long-standing dispute that also characterized the Lusignan period. Aimery also got Cyprus recognized as "kingdom", a title granted to him by Holy Roman Emperor Henry VI. He then regained officially the title of the King of Jerusalem by marrying Henry II of Champagne's widow, Isabel. Though in name only, this title was something the Lusignan kings were very proud of as it appears on the Cypriot coat of arms. After some skirmishing in Acre with the Sultan of Egypt al-Malkik al-Adil, a treaty was granted in 1204 giving him some advantages in Palestine. It is said that his eating too much fish in one sitting was his cause of death in 1205.

Hugh I
The kingship then passed to his son, Hugh I (1205–1218). He participated in the useless 5th crusade, and died suddenly in Tripoli. Maria Komnene, dowager queen of Jerusalem, and a daughter of a former Byzantine dux of Cyprus, conducted the negotiations for the marriage of her granddaughter Alisia of Jerusalem to Hugh I of Cyprus, king Aimery's eldest surviving son and successor, in accordance with the agreement their fathers had reached. Champagne's regentess, Blanche of Navarre, supplied Alisia's dowry as she sought to ensure that Alisia would stay in Cyprus rather than attempting to lay claim to Champagne and Brie. Alisia and Hugh I married in the first half of 1210, with Alisia receiving the County of Jaffa as the agreed dowry. Hugh's marriage with Alisia of Jerusalem (daughter of Henry of Champagne and queen Isabella I of Jerusalem) produced only one son, Henry I (1218–1253), but also two daughters.

Henry I
Henry I became king at the age of 8 months, when his father died. The official regency was undertaken by Henry's mother Alice, but the acting regent was Henry's uncle Philip of Ibelin, who had Henry crowned at the age of 8, to ward off advances from Frederick II, Holy Roman Emperor. When Philip died, the regency passed to Philip's brother John of Ibelin, the Old Lord of Beirut, who maintained it until Henry came of age at 15.

When Henry was 12, Emperor Frederick seized the regency, taking it by force from John of Ibelin. However, when Frederick left the island of Cyprus, the popular John of Ibelin rallied forces from the Outremer, and retook the island, which began the War of the Lombards. In the Battle of Aghirda, the much smaller force of Ibelins won a surprising victory over the imperial forces, and the efforts of Frederick. known as the Stupor Mundi proved unsuccessful. King Henry ("the fat" as he was called, for his easy going manner) played no part in these struggles, but when of age he participated in the 7th crusade under Louis IX of France to destroy the power of Egypt. His forces left behind were forced to surrender in 1250.

At about that time, a Cypriot youngster in search of a better education would travel to the empire of Nicaea and eventually become Patriarch of Constantinople as Gregory II. Gregory's autobiography gives valuable information on the transition from Byzantine to Lusignan rule and its impact on the local population and especially education.

Meanwhile, Henry takes as his 3rd wife Plaisance of Antioch, who finally bears him a son Hugh II (1253–1267) who came upon the throne while only a few months of age. Plaisance acted as his regent, and is described by one chronicler as "one of the most valiant women in the world". She appeared at Acre, now erupting into virtual war between the Venetians, Pisans, and Knights Templar and the Genoese, Spanish, and the Hospitallers. By backing the Venetians, she hoped to have her son recognized as the King of Jerusalem, but the title had little value.

When Plaisance died, Hugh of Antioch became regent.

Hugh III
Hugh II died childless, and Hugh of Antioch changed his name to Hugh III, (1267–1284), taking from his mother's side in order to revive the Lusignan dynasty. The Christian-friendly Mongols were pushing from the east and offered a chance of alliance against the Egyptian Sultan, but the eternally feuding powers of Medieval Europe threw this chance away, while Hugh tried to mediate with them in Syria. He died in Tyre, succeeded by his oldest son John I (1284–1285), and then by his other son Henry II (1285–1324). His reign and reputation suffered from his epilepsy, and in 1286 he was crowned at Tyre for the kingdom of Jerusalem only to see it fall to Egyptian Mameluk sultan. In 1306, Henry's brother Amaury seized power and exiled Henry in Cilicia, but Henry was restored in 1310. He is mentioned in Dante's Paradiso, but it is not a nice reference.

Hugh IV
Rule passed on to his nephew Hugh IV (1324–1359), who found himself in a new privileged position. The fall of the last coastal strongholds of the Kingdom of Jerusalem made it unnecessary for the island to waste its money on its defense. It also made the island the center for Oriental trade, and Famagustan merchants became notoriously rich, and the island as a whole became known for its wealth. Hugh enjoyed a peaceful reign, and preferred to stay on the island.

Peter I
Peter I (1359–1369), son of Hugh IV, may perhaps be the best known king of Cyprus. He is mentioned in Chaucer's canterbury tales. He led an expedition to Alexandria that upset the Italian merchants, but proved successful (at least in gathering booty). He toured Europe in order to gather support for his love of crusading, but found their promises unfulfilled. He sacked Alexandria again regardless, and in destroying the gates found it impossible to hold against the Mameluks. He was driven out, but had he held it would have been a very valuable outpost. He was murdered by his nobles, but left a very devoted wife Eleanor of Aragon (supposedly he took her nightgown with him on his campaigns), who with the help of the Italians pursued the assassins.

Peter II
Upon the ascension of Peter II "the fat", (1369–1382), because of his lethargy, a riot broke out the coronation ceremony at the Cathedral of St. Nicholas in Famagusta between the Venetians and the Genoese. The dispute arose over who would lead the king's horse on the right side; traditionally it belonged to the Genoese but now the Venetians took it. Many Genoese were killed in the riot, and the Italian city responded harshly. In 1374, the island surrendered to the Genoese under terms of tribute, payment for damages, and loss of Famagusta to the Genoese, effectively ending prosperity.

James I
Peter succumbed to his lethargy, and the rule passed on to James I (1382–1398), his uncle and now prisoner in Genoa. He was released on harsh terms, including the proviso that all ships coming into Cyprus land in now Genoese Famagusta. The king also had to raise taxes in order to pay. He added the title the King of Armenia in 1393, though it was useless as well.

Janus
He was succeeded by the son of Peter the II., Janus (1389–1432), though also called the fat was described as "tall and good looking". He unsuccessfully tried to drive the Genoese from Famagusta. In 1426 the Mameluks raided the island, and Janus met them at Khirokitia. Apparently the troops had no water, so they drank wine instead and became rather intoxicated. When a Mameluk embassy was sent, it was treacherously killed by Janus' men. The outraged mameluks slaughtered the inebriated, enfeebled, soldiers under Janus. They then proceeded to expose the hoax of the levitating cross at the monastery at Stavrovouni, containing a piece deposited by St. Helena in the 4th century. Janus was taken to Egypt and paraded around backwards on a donkey in humiliation. At the same time according to the chronicle of Leontios Makhairas Cypriot serfs rebelled against the Franks and established "Re Alexis" as a king in Lefkonoiko (the word Re means king in Provençal and Italian), and "captains" in Morphou, Limassol, Lefka and Peristerona. It took the Frankish nobility more than 6 months to defeat the rebels and Re Alexis was eventually hanged. Two years later Janus was ransomed back, and Cyprus was now ruled by the Mameluks.

John II
His son John II (1432–1458), was described as "effeminate, but not unattractive" and was reviled by Pope Pius II as a vile evil sloth. He was dominated by two women in his life, both Greek; Helena Palaiologina his wife and Marietta de Patras, his mistress. Supposedly in a fight between these two in the king's presence, the queen bit off her adversary's nose. As the queen was Greek, she was well loved by the Cypriots and the orthodox church.

Her daughter Charlotte and her opponent's son James would play huge roles in the collapse of the Lusignan dynasty. James "the bastard", as he was called, was well loved by John, who made him archbishop of the island at a very young age. Yet Charlotte in 1458 was recognized as Queen regent, and James fled to Egypt. The two were said to have had a fairly good relationship, and it is probably very much due to the church that this political conflict arose between them. James convinced the Egyptian Sultan to aid him, promising loyalty to Egypt, and landed, armed, in 1460.

James
James won victories over the major forts, including Genoese Famagusta, and was solidly placed on the throne in 1464. Charlotte had unsuccessfully tried to secure aid from outside, including from the pope. According to legend, James fell in love with his wife Caterina Cornaro while walking with her uncle who purposely dropped an image of her. The two were wed by proxy, and Caterina was adopted by the Venetian state, securing the passage of the island to the signory. James died in 1473, and his short-lived son the next year, and the Venetians were eyed with suspicion. In 1473, the Catalans on the island formed a revolt supporting Ferdinand II of Aragon, that was put down by the Venetians. In 1479, the party of Queen Charlotte plotted to assassinate the queen, but it was betrayed and quashed. Due also to the looming threat of the Ottoman Turks, Venice used the Queen's brother to convince her to abdicate the throne in 1489, ushering in the Venetian period.

See also
Chronicle of Amadi
Cyprus under the Ottoman Empire
History of Cyprus
Kingdom of Cyprus

References

Sources
Hunt, Sir David (ed.) 1994. Footprints in Cyprus. London.
Cobham, C. D. 1908 (reprint 1969). Excerpta Cypria. Materials for a History of Cyprus. Cambridge.
History of Cyprus - Middle Ages by Cypriot Government
 

 
Cyprus